The voiced epiglottal or pharyngeal trill, or voiced epiglottal fricative, is a type of consonantal sound, used in some spoken languages.

Few languages distinguish between pharyngeal and epiglottal fricatives/trills, and in fact the fricatives in Arabic are routinely described as "pharyngeal". However, according to Peter Ladefoged, the Aghul spoken in the village of Burkikhan, Dagestan has both (as well as an epiglottal stop), as presented in these audio files.

Features
Features of the voiced epiglottal trill/fricative:

Occurrence

See also
 Index of phonetics articles

Notes

References

External links
 

Trill consonants
Pulmonic consonants
Voiced oral consonants